Karl Harnoncourt (born 12 August 1934) is an Austrian physician and academic teacher.

Life 
Harnoncourt was born into nobility in Graz, the son of Eberhard Harnoncourt (1896–1970) and Ladislaja Johanna Franziska née Gräfin von Meran, Freiin von Brandhoven. He studied medicine at the University of Graz and was promoted to Ph.D. in 1958. He specialised as an internist at the Landeskrankenhaus (LKH) in Graz, and was habilitated in 1973. He headed a department of the LKH from 1977 to 1999. From 1989, he was president of the institute for preventive medicine of the Joanneum, and from 1989 to 1991 president of the Österreichische Gesellschaft für Pneumologie.

He was influential in the manufacturing of instruments for arterial blood gas test which were made in the 1960s by AVL based on his research.

Family 
Harnoncourt is married; the couple has two sons and three daughters. He is a brother of the conductor Nikolaus Harnoncourt, the theologian Philipp Harnoncourt and the business ececutive Franz Harnoncourt. His daughter was married to American gallery owner Richard L. Feigen.

Awards 
 2013:

References

External links 
 Hein Bruns: Descendants of Archduke Johann of Austria, heinbruins.nl 
 Praxis - Religion und Gesellschaft / Sterbehilfe (in German) ORF 20 January 2021

Austrian internists
20th-century Austrian physicians
People from Graz
1934 births
Living people
Harnoncourt family